Crno zlato is the second studio album by Bosnian pop star Maya Berović. It was released December 2008 through the short-lived IN Music s.r.o. in Bosnia and Herzegovina and Serbia.

Background
Aged 19 in 2006, Maya signed with the Belgrade-based record label Grand Production, co-owned by Lepa Brena and Saša Popović, and released her first studio album Život uživo (2007). Berović signed with IN Music s.r.o. in 2008 after parting ways with Grand Production. In 2015 she explained that she and Grand director Saša Popović had differing ideas and that she is happy with her current label City Records.

In 2008 she teamed up with songwriter Branislav Samardžić and composer Dragan Kovačević D.K. Struja. The result was her second studio album Crno zlato.

Singles
"Sedativ" was released as the album's lead single on 5 May 2008. The title song was released as the second official single in October 2008, followed by "Uspomene" in January 2009. All three singles had music videos.

Track listing

Personnel

Instruments

Ivana Selakov – back vocals
D.K. Struja – keyboards
Petar Trumbetaš – bouzouki, acoustic guitar, electric guitar
Braca Kolarević – saxophone, trumpet

Production and recording

D.K. Struja – arrangement, mixing, mastering, producing, programming
Alen Dragosav – executive producer
Đorđe Janković – mixing, mastering
Dušan Glišić – programming

Crew

Iva Rakić – design
Rade Davidov – makeup, hair
Nenad Todorović – styling
Edvard Nalbantjan – photography

References

2008 albums
Maya Berović albums